Crassula exserta is a herb in the family Crassulaceae that is native to Western Australia.

It blooms between August and December producing white-yellow-pink-red-brown flowers.

It is commonly found among granite outcrops, around swamps in depressions and around saline mud flats in the Great Southern, Wheatbelt, Mid West and Goldfields-Esperance regions.

References

exserta
Plants described in 1918
Flora of Western Australia
Saxifragales of Australia